State Highway 33 (SH-33 or OK-33) is a state highway in the U.S. state of Oklahoma. It is a major highway that traverses most of the state, and at one time traversed its entirety. Its general orientation is west to east.

Route description

Roger Mills County
SH-33 begins as Texas State Highway 33 enters from Hemphill County, Texas. At mile 4.2, it intersects SH-30, which leads to Erick. The highway runs alongside the Black Kettle National Grassland to its intersection with US-283 at mile 15.7. Turning southward, SH-33 overlaps US-283 to mile 16.9 at the community of Roll, where SH-47 joins the concurrency. Together, the three routes pass through the National Grassland, and at mile 24.8, SH-33 turns to the east while US-283 and SH-47 continue south toward Cheyenne. At mile 29.5, SH-33 passes Strong City, and at mile 42.7 it passes the town of Hammon with its intersection with SH-34.

Custer County

The intersection with SH-34 marks the county line.  Mile 53.6 marks Butler, and at 53.8 SH-44 runs out, which leads south to Foss Lake, the town of Foss, and later Altus.  At mile 66.2 SH-33 comes to US-183, which leads south to Clinton.  SH-33 continues north concurrent with US-183
two miles (3 km) to mile 68.2, where US-183 continues northward to Taloga and SH-33 turns east once again.  At mile 72.6, the highway intersects Custer City's Main Street before turning to the left.  At mile 81.7 SH-33 enters Thomas at its second intersection with SH-47.  At 83.8, SH-54 ends, which leads to Weatherford.  At 87.0, SH-33 crosses the South Canadian River, and at mile 90.1 SH-33 enters Dewey County.

Dewey County
As SH-33 enters Dewey County, the section line road on the county line can be followed a few hundred yards west to the unincorporated settlement of Fay.  After a mere  in Dewey County, SH-33 enters Blaine County at mile 91.6.

Blaine County

At mile 94.2, SH-33 reaches an intersection with US-270, US-281, SH-3, and SH-58. Here, SH-58 turns to the east, concurrent with US-270/SH-3 east and US-281 south. The roadway becomes four lanes at this point. At mile 101.3, the routes cross the North Canadian River. At mile 103.8, the routes reach Watonga and an intersection with SH-8 north, which leads to Roman Nose State Park. Here, US-270 and US-281 turn to the south toward Hinton and Red Rock Canyon State Park, and provide an alternate route to Oklahoma City. Upon leaving Watonga, the SH-3/SH-33 roadway reduces to a three-lane arrangement. The two routes continue east to the Kingfisher County line at mile 115.7.

Kingfisher County
Once SH-3/SH-33 have entered Kingfisher County, the road reduces to the conventional two lanes.  At mile 131.5, the concurrency intersects US-81 in downtown Kingfisher.  US-81 northbound goes to Enid and Wichita, whereas SH-3 diverges south onto US-81 southbound, which leads to Okarche, where the two highways split to reach Okla. City and El Reno respectively.  This general vicinity is also the location of the crossing of the Chisholm Trail.  At mile 146.3, SH-33 intersects SH-74F, which straddles the Logan County line south to Cashion.

Logan County
SH-33's path through Logan County mostly parallels the Cimarron River.  At mile 152.0, SH-74 intersects SH-33 with a four-way stop.  Northbound SH-74 leads to Crescent, and southbound SH-74 eventually becomes the Lake Hefner Parkway in Oklahoma City.  For the next few miles, SH-33 passes through the Cedar Valley golf course complex, and at mile 161.2 intersects US-77 in downtown Guthrie, Oklahoma's first capital.  Near the east end of Guthrie, SH-33 once again becomes a four-lane highway before intersecting I-35 at mile 162.9.  At mile 163.1, SH-105 to Tryon cuts off to the right as SH-33 turns to the left.  The historic SH-33 turns off to the right at mile 169.2, although the old alignment is not marked other than a sign pointing to the town of Langston.  At mile 172.4 the driver may diverge from the highway to visit historic Langston University, before the new alignment merges with the old alignment at mile 173.3.  At this point, the highway narrows to two lanes.  The old alignment quickly diverges into the town at Coyle at mile 173.6, and the current roadway crosses the Cimarron River at mile 174.6.

Payne County
The Cimarron River forms the county line, where the scar from an old steel truss bridge is visible just east of the highway. In 2005 A brand new concrete bridge was being built west of the old one. Shortly into Payne County, the highway rejoins the old alignment at mile 175.5.  At mile 185.1, US-177 goes north to Stillwater and overlaps SH-33 eastbound for one mile (1.6 km).  At 186.1, US-177 diverges south into Perkins and toward Shawnee.  As SH-33 continues east through Payne County, it crosses the Cimarron River again at mile 193.1 before intersecting SH-108, which goes north to Ripley, at 193.5.  At mile 195.3, SH-18 comes in from the south, and overlaps SH-33 into Cushing, the "Pipeline Capital of the World."  At mile 201.6, SH-18 diverges north toward Pawnee.  Upon exiting Cushing, SH-33 becomes a four-lane road forging eastward, and at mile 208.1 converges with SH-99, whose south leg leads to Stroud and Ada.  The SH-33/SH-99 concurrency continues east into Creek County.

Creek County
Mile 209.8 is the county line, and shortly thereafter at mile 210.2, SH-33 Bypass provides a route for trucks to circumnavigate Drumright to the north and west. At mile 211.9, on the east side of Drumright, SH-99 diverges to the north toward Pawhuska, and SH-16 travels south toward Muskogee. SH-48 intersects SH-33 at mile 223.1, which goes south to Bristow and north to Cleveland. At mile 234.2 SH-33 intersects I-44, which in this location is the Turner Turnpike, a toll road to Oklahoma City and Tulsa.

History
Formerly, SH-33 extended to the Arkansas state line. However, the advent of the ever-expanding US-412 in Oklahoma would have meant unnecessary concurrencies beyond its current terminus.

From the intersection of SH-66, SH-33 overlapped the then-US-66 through Sapulpa onto New Sapulpa Road, eventually merging into I-44 in west Tulsa.  The three-route concurrency followed the present alignment of I-44 through Tulsa to Cherokee Curve, where SH-66 currently diverges into Catoosa.  I-44 now continues another mile and a half or so to the Creek Turnpike, where the terminus of the Will Rogers Turnpike to Joplin, Missouri has been relocated.  The old SH-33 followed the current US-412 to the junction of US-69, then north along US-69 a couple of miles, then back east, merging onto the current US-412 before crossing the Grand River.  SH-33 followed the current Alternate US-412, whereas the Cherokee Turnpike parallels this narrow and winding road to the Flint Creek Valley.  The historic SH-33 then followed the current alignment of US-412 to the Arkansas State Line, where it became AR-68 in Siloam Springs.

In the Tulsa area, Highway 33 is associated with Dan P. Holmes.  Holmes was an insurance agency owner and Tulsa resident who frequently bought time on local nightly news broadcasts to give commentary on area matters of interest.   He was concerned about what was then the mostly winding 2-lane Highway 33 from Tulsa to Arkansas, and seldom missed a broadcast opportunity to say that “we need to do somethin’ ‘bout this Highway 33.”  Because of this connection in the public mind between Holmes and the improvement of the road, the widened segment of Highway 33 from Chouteau to its connection with Interstate 44 east of Tulsa was officially named the "Dan P. Holmes Expressway."

Popular culture
SH-33 was featured in the 1996 film Twister. It is referred to as "Bob's Road" by the character Rabbit.

Spurs and loops
Truck SH-33 (2.3 mi/3.7 km) bypasses Drumright to the north and west, connecting with SH-99 at the eastern terminus.
SH-33A (decommissioned; 0.1 mi/0.1 km) followed Denver Avenue in Tulsa between 2nd Street and 3rd Street. It was a connector between US 64 and US 75.
SH-33C (decommissioned; 3.0 mi/4.8 km) is now SH-412A.  Leads to Oaks in Delaware County.
SH-33G (decommissioned; 5.3 mi/8.5 km) is now SH-412B.  Goes through the Mid-America Industrial Park and ties in with SH-69A northeast of Chouteau.
SH-33P (decommissioned; 1.2 mi/2.0 km) is now SH-412P.  Goes south from US-412 along NS414 Rd. to EW60 (Admiral Pl.), then along EW60 to the Verdigris River.

Junction list

References

External links
 Archive of Oklahoma State Maps, from the Oklahoma Department of Transportation
 SH-33 at OKHighways.com
 SH-33 at Roadklahoma

033
Transportation in Roger Mills County, Oklahoma
Transportation in Custer County, Oklahoma
Transportation in Dewey County, Oklahoma
Transportation in Blaine County, Oklahoma
Transportation in Kingfisher County, Oklahoma
Transportation in Logan County, Oklahoma
Transportation in Payne County, Oklahoma
Transportation in Creek County, Oklahoma